Archduke Louis, Prince Royal of Hungary and Bohemia and Prince of Tuscany (Louis Joseph Anton Johann; 13 December 1784 – 21 December 1864), was the 15th child of Holy Roman Emperor Leopold II, King of Hungary and Bohemia, Grand Duke of Tuscany, and Infanta Maria Luisa of Spain.

Biography 
Archduke Louis was born at Florence, Italy. He entered the Austrian Imperial Army at an early age and soon gained the rank of Feldmarschal-Leutnant. From 1807 to 1809, he was general director of the military frontier. In 1809, he was appointed commander of V Armeekorps. In this capacity, he fought at the battles of Abensberg, Landshut, and Ebersberg in April and May, after which he relinquished his command.

He also demonstrated his political abilities by representing his brother, Emperor Francis II, on several occasions and was appointed in his brother's will to be head of the State Conference (from 1836 to 1848) which controlled all government offices on behalf of Emperor Ferdinand I. The Archduke was in favour of Metternich's politics and supported absolutism.

He retired after the revolution of 1848 and lived quietly until his death in 1864 in Vienna being the last surviving child of Leopold II.

Ancestry

See also
House of Habsburg

References

 Bowden, Scotty & Tarbox, Charlie. Armies on the Danube 1809. Arlington, Texas: Empire Games Press, 1980.

House of Habsburg-Lorraine
1784 births
1864 deaths
Austrian Empire commanders of the Napoleonic Wars
Austrian princes
Generals of the Holy Roman Empire
Knights of the Golden Fleece of Austria
Grand Crosses of the Order of Saint Stephen of Hungary
Burials at the Imperial Crypt
Sons of emperors
Children of Leopold II, Holy Roman Emperor
Sons of kings